Ikirun is a town in Osun State, Nigeria. It is the headquarters of the Ifelodun Local Government Area. It is a historical city that derived its name from the first ruler of the town called Akinorun.

Basetan was the first settler and founder of present-day Ikirun. He was a hunter and in one of his hunting expeditions, he came across another settlement nearby in Igbo Irele headed by Akinorun. Basetan convinced Akinorun to join him in present-day Ikirun. However, because Basetan was a hunter who used to go on long hunting sprees, he left the day-to-day administration of the settlement in the care of his new friend, Akinorun with the understanding that he would, whenever he was around stand in as the deputy. With this arrangement, the rulership was progressively ceded to Akinorun and his descendants with Basetan and his lineage as the Eesa (deputy), up to the present time. In recognition of this arrangement, whenever a new Akinrun is installed, he mandatorily spends some time in the Eesa's palace as the Eesa's guest (his original landlord) before moving into his palace.

This is also captured in the oriki of the Basetan descendants as “omo arile gba ofe kunrin, which literarily means “he who has enough space in his compound to accommodate male guests" There is a commemorative pillar in oja Oba in Ikirun with the inscription, “Basetan, ode to te ilu Ikirun do," which literarily means, “Basetan, the hunter who founded Ikirun."

Geographical location 
Ikirun is situated in the north-eastern part of Osun State of Nigeria in Osun, northeast division. It is located within latitude 7 degrees 50 feet north of Equator and longitude 4 degrees 40 feet east of the Greenwich meridian. The town is located in a valley surrounded by two hills. Obagun/Gbogi, the hill to the north and Aafo the hill to the south. The mountains Alaroka and Idi-olo are to the east. Ikirun is centrally located in the Osun north-east division of Osun State. It is bounded on the north by the town Inisa in the Odo-otin local government area and to the south of Osogbo, the Osun state capital. To the east by the town Iragbiji in the Boripe local government council area, and on the west by the town Eko-Ende, also in the Ifelodun local government council area.

Population 
It is estimated that the population of Ikirun was about 100,826 (according to National Population Census, Ikirun).

Historical perspectives 
Akinorun had two sons, Akinbiyi and Akinyemi who ruled and died at the original site, Igbo Irele. The other Akinoruns children Oba-Ara, Gboleru and Adedeji moved out of the original site at Igbo Irele because there was a shortage of water. Oba-Ara became the first ruler of the present Ikirun while Basetan became Eesa and head of the traditional chiefs and kingmakers in the town.

In recognition of the original role of Basetan as Oba-Aras host, every Oba soon after his appointment was obliged to spend a period of time, previously three months but now only three days with Eesa. Just as Ikirun is derived from Akinorun so does the title of Oba Akinrun which takes its origin from the same name.

Names of past Obas (kings) in Ikirun 
The former settlement at Igbo-Irele was short lived. Since the establishment of the town, fifteen Akinrun have reigned over Ikirun.
 Olasinde Obaara
 Gboleru
 Aye Munije
 Adedeji I
 Olusosun
 Fatolu
 Oyewole
 Lalowo
 Oyebode
 Oba Adekunle Ishola
 Akadiri (1887 - 1917)
 Oba Kolawole (1917 - 1940)
 Oba Kusamotu Oyewole
 Oba Lawani Adeyemi Oyejola (1945 - 1989)
 Oba Abdul-Rauf Adewale Adedeji II (1990 - 2021)

Traditional chiefs of Ikirun 
 Chief Eesa (head of the king makers)
 Chief Balogun Isegun (Ajawesola)
 Chief Odofin
 Chief Obanla-(Odegbekun)
 Chief Ojomu
 Chief Elemo
 Chief Aro
 Chief Jagun
 Chief Baale Okeba
 Chief Olukotun
 Chief Aogun Ogerende
 Chief Oluawo

Women title holders 
Women who also hold traditional titles in Ikirun.
 Iyalode of Ikirun
 Otun Iyalode
 Osi Iyalode
 Ekerin Iyalode
 Iyaloja

Names of compounds in Ikirun

Federal government agencies in Ikirun 
 Federal Ministry of Works and Housing Along Ikirun-Ofa Express Road, Ikirun
 Federal Office of Statistics, Ikirun
 General Post Office Station Road, Ikirun
 Immigration Office, New Ifelodun Local Government Secretariat, Ikirun
 Independent National Electoral Commission (INEC) Station Road, Ikirun
 National Orientation Agency (NAO), Old Ifelodun Local Government Secretariat, Ikirun
 National Population Commission Old Ifelodun Local Government Secretariat, Ikirun
 National Youth Service Corps Zonal Headquarters, New Ifelodun Local Government Secretariat, Ikirun
 Nigerian Telecommunication (NITEL) Station Road, Osogbo
 State Security Services, Ikirun
 The Nigerian Police Divisional Headquarters Iyaganku, Ikirun
 The Nigerian Police, Motor Traffic Division, Oja Oba, Ikirun

Osun State government agencies 
 Chief Magistrate Court Iragbiji Road, Ikirun
 Fire Service Along Station Road, Ikirun
 High Court Eko Ende Road, Ikirun
 Ifelodun Local Government Education Authority Akinorun Grammar School-Express Junction, Ikirun
 Land and Physical Planning Bureau, Labaeka Estate, Old Inisha Road, Ikirun
 Ministry of Education Along Iragbiji Road, Ikirun
 Ministry of Finance, Commerce and Industry (Internal Revenue) Oke Afo, Ikirun
 Ministry of Health (Primary Health Care Center), Olaore Estate, Inisha Road, Ikirun
 Ministry of Works (Zonal Office), Eweta, Ikirun
 Osun State Agricultural Mechanization Corporation, State Headquarters, Ikirun
 Osun State Property Development Corporation (Agunbe Estate), Osogbo Road, Ikirun
 Osun State Water Corporation (Zonal Office), Old Inisha Road, Ikirun

Daily and weekly markets in Ikirun 
 Oja Oba which is attended every day. It is situated directly in front of the Obas palace. It is a market for daily needs of the citizens. Activities commence daily, as early as 7am until 10pm.
 Oja Oba Adeyemi popularly known as Oja Alamisi (Thursday Market). It is attended once every Thursday. It is situated along Oke Afo-Express junction road, Ikirun. Mostly sold are fruits, foodstuff that are brought from various villages closer to Ikirun. The market opens as early as 5am and closes by 6.30pm.
 Oja Oba Adedeji popularly known as Oja Monday which is open every Monday. It is situated directly in front of Akinorun Grammar School, Railway Station Road, Ikirun. Items sold and hours for this market are similar to that of the Thursday market.
 Oja Oba Adedeji, popularly known as Oja Satide is open on Saturday and is situated along State Hospital Road, Ikirun. It is a mini weekend market, where traders from various villages come to sell their farm produce.
 Oba Adedeji Shopping Complex, situated along Oke Afo, Osogbo Road, Ikirun.

Hotels, restaurants and canteens 
 Irewolede Hotel, Oyedokun Street, Ikirun
 Kentaido Hotel, Station Road, Ikirun
 Obalowu Hotel, Eweta, Ikirun
 Olooku Relaxing Corner, Oke Aafo, Ikirun
 Olusanu Hotel, Odo Amo, Ikirun
 Otitoleke Guest Inn, Oke Afo, Ikirun
 Rainbow Hotel, Oyedokun Street, Ikirun
 Rif Cafeteria, Okiti Baba, Inisha Road, Ikirun

Banking institutions 
 First Bank PLC, Inisha Road, Ikirun
 Ifelodun Community Bank, Oke Aafo, Ikirun
 Skye Bank PLC, Inisha Road, Ikirun
 Union Bank PLC, Inisha Road, Ikirun

Traditional Irele Festival in Ikirun 
The Irele festival comes up in July every year to coincide with harvest of new yams. In Ikirun, new yams must not be brought to the Obas market for sale until after Irele yam festival is held.

Irele festival is celebrated to commemorate the companion of founder of Ikirun. History has it that Akinorun came with a companion, named Irele. Like Akinorun, he was a powerful hunter and warrior. They both first settled in what is known as Igbo Irele. Not quite long after their arrival at Igbo Irele, Akinorun took ill. He called his companion and his people, and handed the leadership over to Irele. Thereafter he died.

The administration of the town and welfare of all that was left by Akinorun were in the hands of Akinoruns' children and Irele. He took up the challenge and whenever war threatened Igbo Irele, he quickly rose and fought gallantly.

Irele announced his imminent death and gave certain instruction that must be adhere to by the people. He gave them two calabashes with instructions to never to open them. He then dipped Osanyin's staff into the ground with instructions that whenever an attack was imminent, the people should go there and call his name upon which he would fight for them. He added that when he died his black dog must be sacrificed. With these instructions, Irele, according to legend, entered into the ground. Akinoruns' eldest son, Akinbiyi continued the administration.

Appreciation 
It was in appreciation of what Irele did for Ikirun when he was alive that the people deified him and made a covenant that they would worship him and offer him sacrifices every year during the month of July to coincide with the harvest of the yams.

Egungun Festival in Ikirun 
In Yoruba land, there is a festival called Egungun Festival. In Ikirun, Chief Ojomu is the traditional Chief in charge of Egungun Ilu (Town masquerade) while Chief Olota is the leader of all Egungun Oje (Magical masquerade) of the town.

The Egungun Festival comes in May annually and lasts for seven consecutives days. It is Chief Olota and Chief Ojomu who fix the days of the Celebration of the Egungun Festival in Ikirun. On the appointed day, Akinorun and his traditional Chiefs move to celebrate in the residence of Chiefs Ojomu and Olota, and will later proceed to Igbo Igbale for further ceremonies. On the third day known as Ojo Ita all Egunguns in Ikirun would come out. There are two types of Egungun in Ikirun. The first group are the Egungun Ilu otherwise known as Eegun Olore. They whip one another to entertain people. These include Doodika (Sika), Orogun meji, Labinkolo, Yemoja, and Yerepe. The second category is the Egungun Oje. They are masquerades who perform magical acts (Idan) to entertain people. These include Owolewa, Eyeba, Alagbaa and Eyefo-odo.

On the seventh day (Ijo Ije), Chief Ojomu and Olota feast with the Egunguns, celebrants and other traditional chiefs. They prepare meals such as pounded yam and egusi soup. All Egunguns come out and pay homage to Akinrun and his Chiefs at the palace. The Egunguns will entertain the Oba and the chiefs and thereafter offer prayer for Akinrun. As part of the ceremony, the masquerades proceed to the central market, near the Akinruns palace where they entertain the townsfolks by blessing the artisans, traders and market men and women. The people in turn give presents like kolanut and money to all the masquerades.

Ikirun Day Celebration 
The idea behind Ikirun Day Celebration was the outcome or aftermath of a meeting of all Clubs in Ikirun which took place in December, 1991. The main objectives or purpose of Ikirun Day Celebration are as follows: First, to give the indigenous people of Ikirun an opportunity to get acquainted with the progress that their town has made so far, its problems and aspirations, and to make an assessment of the areas which various clubs and associations could be of help, financially and morally to the historic town.

Secondly, Ikirun Day Celebration is an occasion of reunion. The day is celebrated so as to generate rapport among the Ikirun indigenous by bringing them together in a carnival-like atmosphere, at least once a year.

Thirdly, to bring home the Ikirun indigenous people who sojourn in far away places without coming home for many years.

Fourthly, the day is also set aside to generate and raise funds for the developmental projects like the building of a modern palace for Akinrun.

Lastly, to invite visitors, investors, outsiders and friends to Ikirun in order to know the indigenous people and to appreciate the beauty and culture of the township.

The first Ikirun Day was on 18 April 1992 at the Akinorun Grammar School, Ikirun. The day was preceded by prayers in the mosques and churches, symposium and paying of homage to Kabiyesi by the people of Ikirun at home and abroad.

Development projects needed at Ikirun 
 Award of Scholarship to indigenes
 Citing of small scale industries
 Construction of a Stadium
 Construction of Cultural Center
 Construction of more classrooms in our primary and secondary schools.
 Efficient distribution of mail in Ikirun
 Equipping the Ikirun Library with current books and computers
 Erection of roundabout at Oba Adedeji market
 Establishment of higher institution of learning
 Establishment of more banks
 Expansion of market stalls
 Provision of recreational facilities
 Provision of street lights in Ikirun
 Rehabilitation and tarring of existing township roads
 Renovation of Town hall
 Repairs of broken water pipes in the town

Primary schools in Ikirun 
 10. All Saints African Primary School, Oke Iroko, Ikirun
 Baptist Day School, Oke Iroko, Ikirun
 C.A.C. Primary School, Ikirun
 Community Primary School, Eweta, Ikirun
 El-Shaddai International School, 56 Olonde Street, P.O. Box 104, Ikirun. https://www.elshaddaites.com/
 Holy Michael Cherubin and Seraphim Church School, Ikirun
 Holy Trinity Primary School, Oke Aafo, Ikirun
 Unique International School, Ikirun
 L.A. Primary School, Moboreje, Ikirun
 Legacy Private School, Iragbiji road, opposite Eid Praying ground, Ikirun, Osun State
 Local Authority Primary School, Moboreje, Ikirun
 Methodist Primary School II, Oke Aafo, Ikirun
 Methodist Primary School, Oke Aafo, Ikirun
 Nawair Udeen Primary School
 Oba Adeyemi Street, Ikirun
 Savior Primary School, Behind Old Motor Park, Ikirun
 School for the Handicapped Children, Oke Iroko, Ikirun
 St. Pauls R.C.M. Primary School, Ikirun

Post-primary institutions in Ikirun 
 African Church Grammar School, Idi Olo area, Old Iragbiji Road, Ikirun
 Akinorun Grammar School, Station Road, Ikirun
 Coker Memorial Grammar School, Old Inisha Road, Ikirun
 El-Shaddai International College, 56 Olonde Street, P.O. Box 104, Ikirun. https://www.elshaddaites.com/
 Federal Government College, Odo Amo, P.O. Box 5203, Ikirun, Osun state
 Foundation Model College, Moboreje Area, Ikirun, Osun State
 Holy Michael High School, Iragbiji Road, Ikirun, Osun State
 Legacy Private School, iragbiji road, opposite Eid Praying ground,  Ikirun, Osun State
 Onaolapo Memorial Grammar School, Isale Agunjin, Ikirun
 Orimolade Commercial Grammar School, Iragbiji Road, Ikirun
 Saint Kizito Catholic College, Behind Ifelodun Local government secretariat, P.O.Box 388, Ikirun. Osun State
 School of Science, Old Inisha Road, P.O. Box 446, Ikirun

References 

ACKNOWLEDGEMENT AND REFERENCES IKIRUN A TOWN IN OSUN STATE, NIGERIA By Taye Olasunkanmi Bello, Adeolu Printing Press, Adenuga Gbongan. Osun State, Nigeria. 1st edition, 1997. Printed in Nigeria.

Populated places in Osun State